Sarah Marjorie Hoffman  (born May 23, 1980) is a Canadian politician who served as the 10th deputy premier of Alberta and minister of Health in the cabinet of Rachel Notley. Hoffman was previously a member of the Edmonton Public School Board, where she served from 2010 to 2015 and from 2012 onward as chair. Prior to her service on the school board, she was the research director of the Alberta Legislature New Democrat caucus. After stepping down from the School Board, she was elected in the 2015 Alberta general election to the Legislative Assembly of Alberta representing the electoral district of Edmonton-Glenora for the Alberta NDP. On May 24, 2015 she was sworn in as Minister of Health and Minister of Seniors for the province of Alberta. Following a cabinet reshuffle on 2 February 2016, she retained the Health portfolio and became deputy premier, primarily responsible for answering questions to the premier when the premier is not present in the Legislature.

Background
Hoffman has worked as both a teacher and researcher for the NDP before becoming involved in politics. She holds a BA and BSc from Concordia University College of Alberta, in religion and math respectively. She also holds a Bachelor of Education and a Master of Education from the University of Alberta, with a specialization in educational policy studies.

Hoffman was first elected to the Edmonton School Board in 2010, and was acclaimed for a second term in 2013. She served as the vice-chair of the board from her initial election to 2012, and then as the chair from 2012 to 2015 when she resigned to run for provincial office.

Hoffman is also a past member of the Girl Guides of Canada.

Political career

Initial cabinet appointment 
Hoffman was appointed Minister of Health and Seniors, on May 25, 2015. As health minister, Hoffman is responsible for policy, direction, legislation and standards of the health system in Alberta, which is delivered by Alberta Health Services.

Affordable housing was part of the NDP's campaign commitment to increase affordable housing for seniors, and was actioned in part through increasing funding for the Alberta Social Housing Corporation. In 2016, Lori Sigurdson was given the seniors portfolio, while Brandy Payne was appointed Associate Minister of Health.

Under Hoffman's tenure, health care fees proposed under Jim Prentice and Stephen Mandel were soon reversed, and additional spending in health was initiated. Included in the budget was funding for new and existing medical centres, including the development of the Calgary Cancer Centre and repair of the Royal Alexandra Hospital in Edmonton, though Hoffman was criticized over the reduced level of funding available. Hoffman's ministry also banned menthol tobacco products in September, a move which was designed to decrease the prevalence of smoking among youth.

Alberta Health Services discontinued both IVF and IUI services at the Lois Hole hospital for women when the physicians moved to a different clinic.

Fentanyl crisis 
Prior to Payne's appointment as associate minister, Hoffman was responsible for her department's response to the fentanyl crisis in Alberta. The street drug killed 213 people in the first 9 months of 2015, and is projected to have increased use in 2016. Hoffman outlined the province's response to the drug, stating that increased quantities of naloxone would be available to counter-act the overdose effects of fentanyl. The province has also engaged in an information campaign directed at youth, to prevent further use of the drug. This campaign primarily targets schools, with posters being placed in prominent areas that outline the harmful effects of using the drug.

The response of the provincial and federal governments has been criticized, as access to the antidote remains low despite an increasing number of fentanyl-related deaths. This problem is particularly pronounced on indigenous reserves, which have less available access to government clinics, and instead rely on a combination of provincial services and federal support to obtain the materials required to treat fentanyl overdoses. As part of the provincial government's response, Hoffman communicated with indigenous chiefs to find ways of increasing antidote supply on reserves in August 2015.

Controversy
Hoffman came under fire for comments made during question period, wherein she suggested the then opposition Wildrose Party was spending too much time with "sewer rats". Many Wildrose supporters felt the sewer rats comment was directed at them. Hoffman later apologized for the remarks.

Electoral record

2019 general election

2015 general election

Notes

References

1980 births
Alberta New Democratic Party MLAs
Living people
Members of the Executive Council of Alberta
Politicians from Edmonton
Women MLAs in Alberta
Concordia University alumni
University of Alberta alumni
Alberta school board trustees
21st-century Canadian politicians
21st-century Canadian women politicians
Women government ministers of Canada
Health ministers of Alberta
Deputy premiers of Alberta